Urban wilderness is vacant property in urban areas that is reverted to its original biome and repurposed for recreation. This is part of the New Urbanism movement that seeks to combine greenery in urban planning. Urban wilderness is also seen as a way to use abandoned land from city shrinkage. This concept is especially popular in Europe and the United States.

Overview 
Key traits of urban wilderness that differentiate it from lawns and other forms of plantings are:

 Biodiversity - a wide range of species, both of plants and animals
 Minimal maintenance required for viability - plants that can survive without frequent watering, can withstand local pollution levels, and do not depend on infusions of fertilizers or other periodic soil amendments, often called xeriscaping.
 Deep beds - deep soil allowing the creation of mature root growth, protection from drought and destructive temperature changes, and the development of a healthy colony of microorganisms, worms, and other beneficial small lifeforms
 Native species - use of local plant varieties rather than [[exotic species|exotic species
 Unstructured aesthetic - plants are allowed to grow as they wish, where they wish, with minimal space devoted to paved walkways, trimmed grass, or other artificial environments
 Tolerance of ground cover and thick undergrowth - healthy ecosystems depend on "messy" micro-environments like decaying logs, thick brush, and muddy ground.

Urban wilderness has been created by programs as varied as the New York City Parks Department's Green Streets program (which converts median strips and other micro-environments into planted areas) and small programs in such places as Davis, California and Portland, Oregon to reintroduce native species.

History
The nineteenth and twentieth centuries saw the urbanization of cities. Jacob Riis and other reformers fought for parks in urban areas. 

While many societies had traditions of intense urban plantings, such as the rooftops of pre-conquistador Mexico City, these traditions did not reemerge on a larger scale in the industrialized world until the creation of naturalistic urban parks, such as the ones by Calvert Vaux and Frederick Law Olmsted. 

More recently, groups such as squatters and Reclaim The Streets have performed guerrilla plantings, worked in and on abandoned buildings, and torn holes in highway asphalt to fill with soil and flowers. These actions have been effective in creating new planted zones in economically stagnant areas like urban eastern Germany, where abandoned buildings have been reverted to forest-like conditions.

See also
Hundertwasserhaus
Green roof
Green wall
Urban forestry
Urban ecology
Urban agriculture
 Urban prairie

References

Urban planning
Habitats
Urban forestry